New York City Subway nomenclature is the terminology used in the New York City Subway system as derived from railroading practice, historical origins of the system, and engineering, publicity, and legal usage. Important terms include lines, or individual sections of subway, like the BMT Brighton Line; services, like the B, which is a single train route along several lines; and stations, such as Coney Island–Stillwell Avenue, which connects multiple lines and services.

Lines and services on the New York City Subway are often confused with each other. Lines are physical train tracks, while services are the routes that use the tracks. This distinction is also made on other systems, including the Washington Metro and historically Taipei Metro, although the exact terms used differ.

Characteristics

Each section of subway has three identifying characteristics, line, service and color.

Subway lines 
The most constant is the line, the physical structure and tracks that trains run over. Each section of the system is assigned a unique line name, usually paired with its original operating company or division: Brooklyn–Manhattan Transit Corporation (BMT), Interborough Rapid Transit Company (IRT), Independent Subway System (IND). For example, the line under Eighth Avenue is the IND Eighth Avenue Line. Some lines have changed names (and even divisions), but this happens relatively infrequently.

Public usage of the line names varies widely, although the MTA's public usage of trunk names has increased since 2012, especially on Fastrack signs. Internally, the MTA also uses the names, both for legal reasons and to describe lines, services and locations without ambiguity. Although the three major subway systems are now unified, the terms BMT, IRT and IND are still used in line, structure and building descriptions and capital contract specifications. However, the names of the former companies are no longer used by much of the general public.

Service designations 
Each operating service or route is assigned a letter or number. This is a path that the train service uses along the various lines. These are the most familiar names among the public, but may change frequently during construction or as services are rerouted to make best use of the network. Former IRT services (now known as A Division) are assigned numbers, and former BMT and IND services (now known as B Division) are assigned letters. 

Prior to consolidation under city ownership in 1940, the BMT routes were also assigned numbers. As track connections were built between IND and BMT lines to create a unified division, the BMT routes were gradually assigned letters for consistency with the IND naming scheme. IRT trains and tunnels are narrower, however, so the two divisions do not mix in revenue service.

Diamond services

Despite its efforts toward single identifiers for each service, the MTA has adopted a variation of a signage practice that began with street railways, in which a variant service is identified with a special color or symbol on the route number signs. This has been implemented on the subway by use of diamond services. Since a route letter or number is ordinarily presented inside a circle, variants of the same service are shown as the same letter or number inside a diamond shape.

In use
6 regular service operates local at all times; weekday peak-direction <6> diamond service runs express in the Bronx (with local service in the same direction cut back to Parkchester).
7 regular service operates local at all times; weekday rush-hour peak-direction <7> diamond service runs express in Queens.
F regular service operates at all times; weekday rush-hour peak-direction <F> diamond service runs express in Brooklyn.

Former use
Until May 2005, rush hour 5 service to Nereid Avenue–238th Street in the Bronx was marked with a diamond with regular "circle" service to Eastchester–Dyre Avenue. Both services were express services in the Bronx between East 180th Street and Third Avenue–149th Street during rush hours in peak direction.

Diamond service operated on the BMT Brighton Line while the north side of the Manhattan Bridge was closed for repairs from 2001 to 2004. Full-time local service was designated with a circle Q while weekday-only express service was designated with a diamond <Q>. Other services have also used the diamond before and during the closure from 1986 to 2004; at least one (a brown <R>) dated from a BMT special service using the same number (BMT 2) as the main service that became the R from 1986 to 1988.

In addition to the <5>, <6>, and <7>, official maps and schedules used to show several other rush-hour only services with a diamond, including the <4> bypassing 138th Street, <A> to Rockaway Park, <B> and <C> to Bedford Park Boulevard, <D> express on the IND Concourse Line, and the <M> to Bay Parkway. In May 2004, the map was changed to show only the diamond <6> and <7>. The diamond symbol usage has thus been redefined to indicate a variant rush-hour express service running simultaneously with a local service in the same direction.

Special services

Special is a signifier for a train that is running along a nonstandard route. It is sometimes used for special holiday trains, baseball game service, or for emergency or custom routes. Most trains have a "Special" option on the rollsigns or LCD/LED displays.

Colors and trunk lines 
Each service is also assigned a color. Since 1979, each service's color corresponds to the line a service primarily uses in Midtown Manhattan. This is defined as the trunk line. The list of trunk lines and colors is shown in the following table.

Station names

Stations usually bear street names, but may also be named after neighborhoods or prominent locations (e.g., "Brighton Beach" for Brighton Beach; "Cypress Hills" for Cypress Hills, Brooklyn) or combinations of these (e.g., "Times Square–42nd Street" for Times Square and 42nd Street; "Astoria–Ditmars Boulevard" for Astoria and Ditmars Boulevard), especially at line terminals. Others are named after major destinations, either along with the street names (e.g., "68th Street–Hunter College" for Hunter College, "81st Street–Museum of Natural History" for American Museum of Natural History) or in some cases without (e.g., "Pelham Bay Park" for Pelham Bay Park, "Borough Hall" for Brooklyn Borough Hall). Of the system's  stations, more than 300 are named after streets or street intersections alone, while the remainder are identified by different combinations of streets, neighborhoods and landmarks.

Many stations share names, so to uniquely identify a station, the line name or cross street must be specified: for example, there are three stations named Kings Highway in Brooklyn. Usually, identifying the service is also sufficient (e.g., "Kings Highway on the B and Q" to denote the station at East 16th Street), but as services are transient, this is not a permanent label. 

The MTA has looked at certain station names as a source of revenue. In June 2009, the Atlantic Avenue/Pacific Street station in Brooklyn was renamed Atlantic Avenue–Barclays Center following a deal with Forest City Ratner who pay $200,000 per year for the rights to the name. Additionally, Willets Point–Shea Stadium on the otherhand was renamed Mets–Willets Point because the MTA could not reach a deal with the Mets organization. Had the naming rights deal been achieved, the station would have been known as Willets Point–Citi Field.

Describing directions

Public information
Directions along a line in Manhattan or the Bronx are usually described as uptown and downtown, roughly corresponding to compass north and south. Uptown and downtown are not always meaningful on lines in the other boroughs or on the crosstown IRT Flushing and BMT Canarsie Lines or the downtown-only BMT Nassau Street Line, so these are usually described as terminus-bound (with terminus being the name of the terminal station) for "downtown" and Brooklyn-bound or Queens-bound for "uptown."

On the BMT system, most in-station signage specified to city and from city. Currently signs typically read to Manhattan, if the train is heading toward Manhattan, and to destination (e.g. to Coney Island or to Canarsie), if the train is heading toward an outer-borough destination. If the train is headed to a different borough, it is described as borough-bound (e.g. Manhattan-bound or Brooklyn-bound). If its terminus is in the same borough, it will be described as terminus-bound, for example, Eighth Avenue-bound or Rockaway Parkway-bound. If the final destination is more than one borough away, signs will generally display the name of the next one or two boroughs that the route will pass through. Trains would display to Uptown and Borough if the train is heading uptown and into another borough, or to Downtown and Borough if the train is heading downtown and into another borough.

Internal usage
In the United States, most railroads have only two rail directions. In this vein, all New York City subway lines are deemed to run north–south. In many cases, this is close to the related compass direction, but this is not always possible. Any line that enters Manhattan from the Bronx or Queens heads south into Manhattan; any line entering Manhattan from Brooklyn goes north into Manhattan, with the BMT Nassau Street Line and BMT Canarsie Lines being the only exception, as the Nassau Street Line heads further south into Manhattan's Financial District after entering Manhattan over the Williamsburg Bridge, and the Canarsie Line goes neither north nor south. Directions of other lines are determined by following the services that run over them; except for the BMT Eastern Division services (over the Williamsburg Bridge), which change direction at Chambers Street, every service has one north end and one south end. On the 42nd Street Shuttle, railroad north is compass west, due to the line's former status as part of the main line.

In fact, very few track connections exist to allow a train to reverse railroad direction without running around a loop or literally reversing direction by backing up. The IND system (except on the ex-LIRR Rockaway Line) has none of these; this philosophy may explain the lack of track connections between parallel IND lines at Seventh Avenue in Manhattan and Hoyt–Schermerhorn Streets in Brooklyn.

Before unification, all BMT lines ran east–west, west being towards Manhattan. After unification, west became north and east became south.

History
This nomenclature has been complicated by the differing systems and cultures of the former private companies that operated parts of the system, by the need for non-ambiguous names in a city where there are stations with the same name on different lines in different locations and even different boroughs, and by changing perceptions of the best way to communicate information to a diverse public.

Up until 1940, there were three major operators of New York subway and elevated lines, the privately owned Brooklyn–Manhattan Transit Corporation (BMT), the privately owned Interborough Rapid Transit Company (IRT) and the municipally-owned Independent Subway System (ISS or ICOS before 1940, now IND).

Service labels have always been assigned based on their outer line (Brooklyn on the BMT, Bronx on the IRT and IND) and then by the Manhattan trunk if necessary to distinguish multiple services on the same line.

BMT

The BMT was the inheritor of subway, elevated and surface rapid transit lines that had been built in Brooklyn and Queens by a variety of previous operators, mainly surface steam railroads to Coney Island and elevated railroads in more populated areas. The BMT identified most of its lines by the common names given to them, often going well back into the 19th century. Services on these lines usually had the same name as the branch line they operated on; for example, the line that the current F service runs on in Brooklyn was (and is) the Culver Line, and the BMT signed these trains Culver Local or Culver Express.

Partly as a result of its steam railroad history, BMT terminals were far more likely to be named after neighborhoods or towns, rather than streets, so trains were signed for Coney Island, Canarsie and Jamaica rather than Stillwell Avenue, Rockaway Parkway and 168th Street. Stations also tended to use local names, but this gradually changed, especially as lines were upgraded, so that stations like Bath Junction on the Sea Beach Line became New Utrecht Avenue and Manhattan Terrace on the Brighton Line became Avenue J.

The BMT introduced numbers for all its services in 1924 but these were mostly for map purposes, since none of equipment displayed line numbers until the D-type Triplex cars were introduced as prototypes in 1925, and then in production in 1927, and these only on the front of the trains (but after 1953 on R16 equipment also on the sides ). In 1931 these numbers were also used on 20 IND R1  cars when they were tested by the City on BMT lines, and also on 140 of these cars from 1949 to 1955 while in BMT service as well.

IRT

The IRT was the contractor with the City of New York to operate the first subway line; by that time it was already leasing all the elevated railways in Manhattan. Unlike the BMT, the IRT had multiple long mainlines (eventually six of them) from which several branch lines extended into the Bronx, Queens and Brooklyn. The IRT therefore named their services for these mainlines rather than their branches. The branch lines were mentioned on the destination signs instead, so that typical signage read Lexington Avenue Express to Woodlawn — Jerome and Utica Avenue — Brooklyn, meaning Woodlawn on the Jerome Avenue Line and Utica Avenue on the Brooklyn Line. Where a service ended in downtown Manhattan, it simply carried the destination name, for example South Ferry or Chatham Square.

The IRT subways used a logical numbering system, but the numbers were not used publicly until the R12 cars were introduced in 1948, under City management. Due to the lack of new IRT construction, this system has largely stayed intact to this day, with the only major changes being at the Brooklyn end.

IND

The IND adopted the IRT system whole but reversed the terminal and line name on the destination signs: Queens - 179th St. for 179th Street terminal on the Queens Boulevard Line. The IND also adopted a similar logical labeling system, but used them publicly on trains and maps. Single letters were used to indicate an express service and double letters indicates locals. For example, the CC ran local and the C ran express on the Concourse and Eighth Avenue Lines.

Unlike the IRT labels, the IND letters no longer follow the original pattern; the uptown branches of the B and C services have been switched via a complex process that involved the former AA eventually becoming the C and the B moving to the Concourse Line. Again, major changes have been made at the Brooklyn end (and in downtown Manhattan), but the system was designed for flexibility on that end.

Unification and post-unification

BMT/IND service label integration

When all three systems came under city ownership in 1940, essentially nothing was done to standardize signage for two decades. Stations on the IRT and BMT still said Interborough or BMT Lines or sometimes older designations. Services continued to be signed by their traditional methods for each system. IND and post-Second World War ("R-type") equipment used BMT numbers when operating on BMT services. With the introduction of R12 equipment on the IRT in 1948, IRT subway services (except for the 42nd Street Shuttle) began using the route numbers still used today, which had been used internally but not on trains or maps. Astoria Line trains were only signed as 8 for a year, after which the line, which had been shared with the BMT, was converted for BMT operation only (and the Flushing Line carried only IRT trains).

In 1960, with the delivery of the first R27 class cars for the BMT, the New York City Transit Authority (TA), which had become the operator of the combined system in 1953, began the introduction of letters for BMT services in anticipation of integrating the BMT and IND operationally. The last IND letter used was H, and the letter I was skipped as being too similar to the number 1. The BMT Eastern Division services got the letters J, K, L and M. The BMT Southern Division services were designated N, Q, R and T. P was for some reason skipped over, and while one theory says this was because it might lend itself to bathroom humor, the letter's undesirability for this reason would seem to be disproven by the fact that the letter was later proposed for an emergency line that would replace Long Island Rail Road service to Penn Station in the event of a strike, and the fact that other cities like San Francisco use the letter. A more likely theory suggests that it was originally planned for the last segment of Culver service to Manhattan, which was cut back to a shuttle permanently in 1959, right before the letters were introduced. S was still reserved for "Special" and SS began to be used for shuttles.

Since the BMT was not amenable to the neat IND system, the TA had to make some compromises. They tried to follow the IND system of single-letter expresses and double-letter locals, but the system began to break down under the complex BMT routings. Where on the IND a local simply doubled the express letter (A Eighth Avenue Express, AA Eighth Avenue Local), some lines had multiple local services with different routings. For instance the two Brighton Local services, one via the Manhattan Bridge and the other via the Montague Street Tunnel, were designated QB and QT respectively. The TA had no specific lettering plan for the two Wall Street special rush-hour services, so it just designated these M (Nassau Street Express) temporarily, a letter reserved for use on the BMT Myrtle Avenue Line's Nassau Street service.

During this period, the TA did not change sign rolls on BMT equipment (the D-types and R16s) that carried numbers, so that on the Brighton Line, the R27-operated locals were signed QB or QT but the D-type-operated expresses continued to carry the number 1.

Chrystie Street Connection

In anticipation of the 1967 opening of the Chrystie Street Connection, which combined two major BMT and IND services as single routes and resulted in numerous other changes (especially on the 14 and 15), the TA decided to adopt universal systems of signage and nomenclature. The rationale was that this would make the system more consistent and more understandable for newcomers to the city and tourists, who were presumed to be uninterested in or even confused by historic or community names, or might not be native English speakers.
Branch line names would be eliminated from signage and maps; all services that had Manhattan mainlines would be identified by those names only.
Services would be identified only by letters or numbers wherever possible, even when announcing reroutings.
Terminals would be identified by street names rather than community names where that existed. This had actually begun with the introduction of R-type equipment, when destinations such as Woodlawn and Canarsie were changed to read Woodlawn Road (which is no longer the name of a road) and Rockaway Parkway.
All services would be color-coded for map and rollsign purposes. This proved a daunting task, since the TA wanted to ensure that no two services with exactly the same color would operate over the same line. With a lot of imagination and a lot of color variations, this goal was achieved but proved unwieldy. The colors did not have any particular logic and still produced ambiguity; notably the A service and the E service shared miles of line between Midtown Manhattan and the Rockaway Line in Queens, one as an express, the other as a local. But the A was colored dark blue and the E light blue, not always easily distinguishable.

The 8 designation was brought back for the only remaining IRT elevated service, the IRT Third Avenue Line in the Bronx but trains never displayed the number. When the Lo-V cars (which did not have front signs) were replaced by R12 cars the front roll signs in use did not contain the number 8 and instead displayed the word shuttle. For map and sign purposes MJ was assigned to the last old-style elevated line, standing for "Myrtle Avenue Line to Jay Street", while the "Myrtle Avenue line to Chambers St." subway service would finally receive its M designation. The short-lived new Sea Beach Line super-express service was made NX. The Q, QT and T disappeared when the Chrystie Street Connection opened; thus they never had colors (until after the elimination of double letters, when the Q came back; by that time the current color system was in place). By 1968, all shuttles (SS) were green. For a short time, the off-hour shuttle between Metropolitan Avenue and Myrtle Avenue was added in 1969 when the MJ service to Jay St. was discontinued, and that part of the line abandoned. The shuttle was soon renamed "M", however, as it only ran when the M did not run to Manhattan.

The system immediately showed evidence of problems for various reasons:
Different services at common stations shared common destinations by different routes. N, B and QJ services arriving at DeKalb Avenue, for example, all had Coney Island as a destination, but had no mention of the widely separated routes (Sea Beach Line, West End Line, Brighton Line) used to get there.
Service labels are ephemeral. The TA has frequently shifted lettered routes from one branch line to another, and introduced, changed or deleted letters, making a description like "the D train" meaningless. The D service has been on three completely different Brooklyn branch lines since 1954. K was introduced for a service on the Broadway-Brooklyn Line but was later used for the IND Eighth Avenue Line local which had formerly been AA.
The same lettered or numbered lines may have different destinations by time of day, despite a largely successful effort to minimize this problem.

Elimination of double letters

On June 25, 1979, the former color scheme was scrapped, and the TA settled on the more coherent policy of assigning the same color to every service on each Manhattan mainline, as well as the color lime green for the IND Crosstown Line, which does not enter Manhattan. The same colors are still used today. Nevertheless, no New York subway line is officially referred to by its color, e.g., BMT Broadway Line services as the "Yellow Line."  While referring to lines by their color, as is common in some other cities, is a convenient shorthand for the regions of Manhattan where lines and colors are relatively unambiguous (from roughly Houston Street to 50th Street, and further uptown for the "red" and "green" lines), this practice would be confusing outside of that region (due to multiple services being assigned the same color).

On May 5, 1985, the last significant change in route identification policy was made after the TA had decided in 1981 that the single and double letter system of the original IND was no longer meaningful, given that there were many services that were express for part of their route and local for other parts. In most cases, this was accomplished by simply eliminating the second letter in route designations. There is no longer a letter designation for specials (formerly S).

By the 1990s, the TA were moving steadily toward using traditional line names on maps and especially on signage. All of the southern Brooklyn subway lines now show the traditional line names (except for the BMT Fourth Avenue Line) in order to distinguish between services going to Coney Island via different lines. On BMT/IND equipment branch line names frequently appear on operating trains, in addition to the route letter. R32 equipment with rollsigns, for example, may read:

Newer rollsigns on R40 up to the R68A (including the former rollsigns on the R44 and R46 that now have LCD displays) have the route's bullet on the left side, and the two destinations on the right side. A rollsign on an R68  train may read:

One change which precedes pre-unification has to do with the use of locality names. While these were discouraged during the 1960s after they had been inherited from private operators, many terminal stations are once again described by both a community and a street name; e.g., Inwood–207th Street for the northern destination of the A service, and Wakefield–241st Street for the northern destination of the 2 service.

The JFK Express, started in 1978 and discontinued in 1990, used a turquoise bullet; this stayed through the color change.

Route consistency
Since the unsuccessful attempts at applying the briefly popular schematic theory of diagrammatic maps, line-by-line color-coding, and exclusive use of numbers and letters for service and line descriptions, the MTA has moved steadily toward a more traditional approach, with more geographically correct maps and use of traditional line and community names on maps and public signage. Concurrently, it has been refining its use of the number and letter system to try to achieve consistency across the system.

One major push has been an attempt to have as many services as possible serve the same stations, routes and terminals at all times, with the major exception for most services being the early morning hours of approximately midnight to 5 a.m. For instance, the B and C swapped northern terminals in 1998 so the C could serve the entire local portion of the IND Eighth Avenue Line at all times except nights; previously, the A had made two local stops north of 145th Street on weekends, while being express on the whole line south of 145th Street, because the B did not operate in Manhattan on weekends. In another case, the MTA took advantage of unavoidable service changes forced by the partial Manhattan Bridge closures to swap the Brooklyn segments of the B and D services, with the B becoming the BMT Brighton Line express service and the D becoming the BMT West End Line local (previously the B had been the West End Local and the D the Brighton Local). This enabled the D, a full-time service, to operate continuously on the same route and terminals from Norwood–205th Street in the Bronx to Coney Island–Stillwell Avenue in Brooklyn, while the part-time B became the part-time Brighton Express service, formerly served by the express <Q> (notated with a diamond).

Table of service label use

This is a table of when each service has existed (and been signed for the public). Shuttles were SS until 1985, when they became S (which had been used for specials). 

Various colors were used for shuttles in 1967; in 1968 all six became green, and in 1979 all shuttles became dark gray.

References

Further reading 
 The Best Subway Map in Years, New York Times July 1, 1979 page E20

External links 
 NYCsubway.org - Historical Maps
 NYCsubway.org - Post-War to Today
 NYCsubway.org - FAQ: The Letter, Number and Color Codes of the New York Subways
Line by Line History

New York City Subway